The 2023 XFL season is the second XFL's second season, the first under its new ownership group of Dwayne Johnson, Dany Garcia, and Gerry Cardinale (RedBird Capital), and the third in the history of the XFL brand created and originally owned by Vince McMahon.

The regular season began on February 18, 2023. A player combine was held on June 18, 2022, the 2023 XFL Draft was held from November 15 to 17, and training camps began on January 8, 2023.

Background 
The 2020 XFL season was cut short following five weeks of play in March 2020, as a result of immediate and prolonged stay-at-home orders and prohibitions on large gatherings imposed in an effort to stop the COVID-19 pandemic in the United States. On April 13, 2020, XFL parent company Alpha Entertainment declared bankruptcy in response to the measures, most of which would not be fully lifted until vaccines were made available and widespread in early 2021. The assets of the league were sold to Johnson, Garcia, and Cardinale on August 3, 2020.

After the purchase the new ownership briefly considered a single-market season for 2021, but the timing of the sale process made it difficult to accomplished. During the course of the 2021 offseason, the XFL's new ownership group began discussions with the Canadian Football League regarding a potential partnership; these discussions collapsed in July, leading the league to cancel its planned 2022 season.

As McMahon fired commissioner Oliver Luck shortly before the bankruptcy; the league was left in the stewardship of Jeffrey Pollack during the transition to new ownership until Pollack resigned and was succeeded by former Buffalo Bills president Russ Brandon in November 2021.

Teams
On March 11, 2022, multiple news reports indicated that the XFL had hired Reggie Barlow away from the Virginia State Trojans to serve as a head coach. The reports indicated Barlow would coach a team in San Antonio, Texas; San Antonio was not among the eight cities that hosted an XFL team in 2020 but had begun discussions with the XFL during the 2020 season and had hosted the San Antonio Commanders, the top-attended team in the Alliance of American Football in 2019. Virginia State confirmed Barlow had taken a job with the XFL, but no confirmation from any party had verified the San Antonio team's existence.

On April 6, 2022, multiple news reports indicated that the XFL had hired their second head coach in former NFL Defensive Back Terrell Buckley. The reports indicated Buckley would coach a team in Orlando, Florida; Orlando was not among the eight cities that hosted an XFL team in 2020 but had begun discussions with the XFL about moving the Tampa Bay Vipers there during the 2020 season and had hosted the Orlando Apollos, the second top-attended team in the Alliance of American Football in 2019 and the Orlando Rage, one of the most successful teams in the original XFL in 2001.

On April 6, 2022, A report came out that sources close to the league have mentioned that XFL would be keeping five teams in their original 2020 locations (DC Defenders, St. Louis BattleHawks, Dallas Renegades, Houston Roughnecks and Seattle Dragons), following through with the Vipers proposed move to Orlando, and adding two new teams in San Antonio and Las Vegas. The teams in San Antonio and Las Vegas would replace the New York Guardians and the Los Angeles Wildcats, respectively. 

On May 18, 2022, two separate reports indicated that The Dome at America's Center had left five open dates anticipating the BattleHawks' return, and that TDECU Stadium would host XFL games in 2023.

On May 20, 2022, it is reported that the DC Defenders will go through a rebrand, including a name change, before taking the field in 2023, and on May 22, 2022, Randy Karraker of the St. Louis-based radio station 101 ESPN reports that the XFL was to formally announce the BattleHawks' return on 1 June (no such announcement materialized). Kevin Seifert announced that cities and stadiums, which would largely be in the same scale of college, NFL and Major League Soccer venues the league had used in 2020, would be announced by the end of July, and implied that teams that did not have trademark disputes and were returning from their home cities would retain their 2020 brands.

Directors of player personnel and offensive and defensive coordinators were announced June 9, 2022. Among the announcements was the confirmation of June Jones joining Haslett's staff and former BattleHawks head coach Jonathan Hayes joining Stoops's staff in Dallas.

On July 24, 2022, Johnson and Garcia held an XFL Townhall at Texas Live! where they confirmed all 2020 XFL teams except the New York Guardians, Los Angeles Wildcats and Tampa Bay Vipers would return. New York, Los Angeles, and Tampa would be replaced by teams in San Antonio, Las Vegas and Orlando, Florida. Team 9, the non-playing unified scout team/practice squad, will also not return, with the league taking a more open approach with signing free agents midseason than it did in 2020. The league also announced seven of the eight venues, while the Las Vegas stadium would be announced on later date. On January 5, 2023 Cashman Field was announced as the Vipers home venue.

On September 23, 2022, the XFL online store leaked placeholders for the new team names, prompting speculation that the Renegades, Dragons, BattleHawks, Defenders, and Roughnecks would return to their home cities, that the Vipers brand would be transferred to Las Vegas (in homage to the Las Vegas Valley being the northwestern limit of the Western diamondback rattlesnake's natural habitat), and that the Guardians brand would be placed in Orlando. San Antonio would be branded as the Brahmas. Team identities were scheduled to be released October 31; teaser segments released the day before showed that the Dragons' and BattleHawks' new logos were exact matches to their old logos, and that color schemes matched the Renegades', Guardians', Roughnecks' and Defenders' brandings from 2020, with slight design alterations.

The league's schedule was released on January 5, 2023. With the schedule release, the league realigned to a North/South divisional alignment to allow all three Texas teams to be division rivals.

Players
For the 2023 season, each XFL team started training camp with up to 80-men rosters (66 originally), but had to trim it down to 70 by January 21, 2023, down to 60 two weeks later and then to 50 by February 10. Regular season rosters were suppose to stand at 50 (compared to 52 at the 2020 season), while 45 of those 50 are active on any given game day. Just before the season started the league decided to expand the rosters from 50 to 51 (46 active on game day), so all teams will be able to dress three quarterbacks on their active roster any given week. 14 players on the opening day rosters were on NFL practice squads during the 2022 season, while four 2023 CFL free agents chose to sign with XFL teams.

While in 2020 the league's primary target for players was veteran backups (such as the kind Luck developed in his time in NFL Europe, citing Kurt Warner, Brad Johnson and Jake Delhomme as examples) who may not be getting the repetitions needed to develop properly on NFL scout teams and practice squads. Due to budget concerns and an unwillingness to antagonize the NFL, it does not get into bidding wars for marquee players, but didn't intend to be is a "developmental" league to the NFL, rather a "'standalone' and 'complement' league". In contrast, the 2023 season of the XFL saw the league take a much lower emphasis on professional experience when selecting its quarterbacks, as it noted that the veterans "washed out early" compared to the younger, less experienced talent and that its 2020 breakout star—PJ Walker—was better known at the time for bouncing on and off the Indianapolis Colts practice squad before joining the XFL and ultimately landing the starting position with the Carolina Panthers. The new ownership also embraced more of a "developmental" mentality when they signed a collaboration agreement with the NFL and introduced the "54th man" slogan, which refer to the NFL 53-men roster limit.

During the season, the XFL will hold a weekly centralized workouts for free agents and other athletes every Tuesday.

Draft

The XFL 2023 draft took place at the UFC Apex in Enterprise, Nevada, while the player pool consisted of 1,700 eligible players, after XFL personnel have evaluated nearly 6,000 players at XFL showcases, NFL training camps and tryouts. Of those, 528 players advanced to the preseason rosters. 

The 2023 XFL Draft followed the same basic layout as the 2020 XFL Draft: starting quarterbacks were allocated in a separate process and revealed November 15, while the remaining positions were separated by position. It followed a "snake" format, with each position phase following a random order set prior to the draft, and that order reversing between odd and even rounds of the phase.

Compensation
In 2023, the XFL uses a standard form contract paying $5,000 per week, $800 of which is guaranteed. A $1,000 victory bonus is paid to the players on each game's winning team, including inactive players. Starting quarterbacks will again be eligible for a higher salary. The base annual salary for an XFL player will thus be $59,000, plus room and board in the league's hub at Arlington, Texas, throughout the season valued at approximately $20,000. 

During training camp there will be a mandatory breakfast, lunch and dinner, while the league will also supply "grab and go" snack after dinner. During regular season the XFL will provide two meals and "grab and go" snack. The league will not assist with any off-site living cost. Injured players will get paid.

On March 10, 2023 XFL players have filed a petition (through the United Steelworkers) for a representation election with Region 16 of the National Labor Relations Board.

Player movement

 On January 1 quarterback Bryan Scott was assigned to the Las Vegas Vipers, but he was released a month later when the Vipers signed Brett Hundley.

 On January 24, all teams finalized their mandatory 70-man rosters cut down.

 On February 6, St. Louis Battlehawks release assigned quarterback Ryan Willis.

 On February 9, seven of the eight teams rosters were finalized, while the Battlehawks finalized theirs three days later when they signed a third quarterback (Manny Wilkins).

 After week 2 the Guardians cut quarterback Quinten Dormady who was allegedly involved with giving the team's playbook to Brahmas player. The XFL has reinstated him a day after, and it was later reveled that the accusations were false. He was put on the "Office of the President’s Reserve list", and the Guardians signed Quinton Flowers as a replacement. Dormady was reinstated after the league determined that there's "no basis for disciplinary action".

 On March 4, Arlington Renegades resigned United Football Players Association president Kenneth Farrow II and waived RB Keith Ford.

 On March 6, the league announced a unique three-way trade with the DC Defenders, Arlington Renegades and Orlando Guardians, as D.C. has traded OT T.J. Storment to the Orlando Guardians, Arlington receives receiver JaVonta Payton from the Orlando Guardians, and the Renegades have dealt TE Alex Ellis to the D.C. Defenders.

 On March 7, offensive tackle Jaryd Jones-Smith from the St. Louis Battlehawk was suspended for 2 games, because of a violation of "player safety rules violations during the Sunday, March 5, 2023, game".

Partnerships

Indoor Football League

The XFL signed a player personnel partnership with the Indoor Football League, with the IFL functioning as its de facto minor league. Brendon White was the first player to exercise the option to join the IFL when he signed with the Massachusetts Pirates, while offensive lineman Joshua Frazier would later joined him after he was released by the Guardians.

Tulsa Oilers offensive lineman Larry Williams was the only player who did the opposite way, when he signed with Las Vegas Vipers, and was on the Vipers opening day roster.

NFL Alumni Academy
In April, 2022 the league has signed a partnership with the NFL Alumni Academy to develop potential players which state that every player graduated from the program has an "opt-in" option for XFL contract. In December rumors started circulating that the Academy is looking to terminate the partnership over payment disagreements, which was later revealed as a disagreements over the number of players drafted. The issue was later resolved and the XFL assigned Academy graduates to training camp rosters. 36 alumni were on opening day rosters, while 15 of them were "assigned" players.

Notable players 

 Geronimo Allison
 Ryquell Armstead
 Marcell Ateman
 Kalen Ballage
 Luq Barcoo
 De'Vante Bausby
 Vic Beasley
 Martavis Bryant
 Ben DiNucci
 Matt Elam
 Jordan Evans
 Josh Gordon
 Will Hill III
 Andrew Jamiel
 D'Eriq King
 Marquette King
 Cody Latimer
 Paxton Lynch
 A.J. McCarron
 Cole McDonald
 Quinn Porter
 Luis Perez
 Charleston Rambo
 Eli Rogers
 Abram Smith
 Jordan Ta'amu

Coaches
On March 11, 2022, multiple news reports indicated that the XFL had hired Reggie Barlow away from the Virginia State Trojans to serve as a head coach. The reports indicated Barlow would coach a team in San Antonio, Texas. On April 6, 2022, multiple news reports indicated that the XFL had hired their second head coach in former NFL Defensive Back Terrell Buckley and that the league was looking to re-hire Renegades head coach Bob Stoops and potentially bring back former Vipers head coach Marc Trestman in another capacity, while noting that in regard to coaches, "the situation (was) fluid" at the time and that several other former NFL players were being considered for coaching positions.

On April 13, 2022, the XFL confirmed the hirings of Stoops, Buckley and Barlow, along with the league's five other head coaches, without identifying which teams they would coach. The other head coaches hired were Wade Phillips, Rod Woodson, Anthony Becht, Jim Haslett and Hines Ward. Haslett, who was later identified as the Seattle head coach, reportedly brought on former Roughnecks head coach June Jones as offensive coordinator, as Jones had accidentally leaked news of his new position on Twitter before it had been made official.

Coaching changes
Of the eight head coaches in the XFL in 2020, only one, Arlington Renegades coach Bob Stoops, will return in the same position in 2023.

Rule changes
On December 8, 2022, the XFL announced it would be keeping its rulebook from the 2020 XFL season, with the following revisions:
Play clock changes from 25 seconds from the spotting of the ball, to 35 seconds from the end of the previous play.
Team timeouts increase from 2 to 3 per half.
Regulation overtime rounds decrease from 5 to 3
New option to convert a 4th and 15 to keep the ball in the fourth quarter. This is in addition to the traditional onside kick option, which remains in the rules.
Teams now have one coach's challenge, which can be used to review any officiating decision without restrictions.
In lieu of the on-site sky judge (used in the AAF and 2020 XFL season), all replay decisions will be made from a centralized hub. This hub will retain the error-correction powers the sky judge held.
A new football will replace the proprietary design used in 2020 with a more conventional pebbling and design scheme, industry-standard Horween leather, and the signature of chairwoman Dany Garcia.

Standings

Season structure

Preseason
On July 25, the league announced it had struck an agreement with Arlington, Texas, to serve as the league's centralized hub. The league will host training camps (much as Houston had done in the 2020 XFL season) and practices at various locations in Arlington (Northwest ISD High School, Dragon Stadium, Vernon Newsom Stadium, and Choctaw Stadium), but unlike the United States Football League did in its 2022 season, the XFL will play games in home cities and travel to each city on weekends for games and connection opportunities with the community.

For the 2023 season each team trained at a different stadium in Arlington and share it with another team throughout the season as follows:
Choctaw Stadium - Arlington Renegades and Houston Roughnecks.
Vernon Newsom Stadium - DC Defenders and St. Louis BattleHawks.
Dragon Stadium - Seattle Sea Dragons and Vegas Vipers.
Northwest ISD High School - Orlando Guardians and San Antonio Brahmas.

While teams held joint practices, the planned untelevised "informal scrimmages" for the league’s TV partners, in order to conduct trial runs for their broadcasts, were cancelled as a result of a severe weather in the Dallas Metroplex area.

Regular season
The league is divided into two divisions, North and South. Each team was given a ten-game schedule with no bye weeks, playing two games against each division rival (one home and one away) and one game against each team in the other division.

Postseason
The postseason will be a four-team playoff, with the top 2 teams in each division making the postseason. On February 19, it was announced that the Alamodome in San Antonio, Texas, will host the 2023 XFL Championship.

Season schedule
All games stream on ESPN+ unless otherwise noted. Viewership figures for streaming platform released four weeks after the event.

Week 1

Week 2

Week 3

Week 4

Week 5

Week 6

Week 7

Week 8

Week 9

Week 10

Playoffs
The playoffs will start on April 29 and will end with the championship game on May 13. The XFL Championship Game is scheduled to be played at the Alamodome.

Attendance
Announced attendance figures for each home game. In the weekly columns, dashes (—) indicate away games, while bold font indicates the highest attendance of each team.

League finances
On August 3, 2020, it was reported that a consortium led by Dwayne "The Rock" Johnson, Dany Garcia, and Gerry Cardinale (through Cardinale's fund RedBird Capital Partners) purchased the XFL for $15 million (plus over $9.2 million in debts and payments) just hours before an auction could take place; the purchase received court approval on August 7, 2020. The XFL's parent company originally listed the league with assets and liabilities in the range of $10 million to $50 million.

On August 8, 2022, it was first reported that the XFL was looking for new equity investors in the league. The league has retained PJT Partners to help with the search and raise $125 million in equity funding, while new investors could own up to 35%-45% of the XFL.

Business partnerships
The XFL had announced on the following "Official Partners": Under Armour as the league’s official uniform and equipment partner, Ticketmaster the official ticketing partner, Westgate Resorts the official resort, Progressive as the official auto insurance sponsor, SMT as the official scoring and stats provider, Genius Sports as the official betting data distributor, BOLT6 as official instant replay partner, Ryzer as the official mindset testing partner and Teremana Tequila as the "league’s official and exclusive tequila partner". The agreement with Under Armour would later expand, when the league announced an "expansive multi-year partnership".

The XFL also announced the following partnerships: Catapult Sports for performing technology, BreakAway Data for performance, training, recovery and player health data and Virtual Tables partnership to "incorporate their DigiSign product into the league's fan engagement offerings".

The league signed a three-year agreement with the city of Arlington, Texas, and Choctaw Stadium to be their centralized operations hub for preseason and in-week training for the league’s eight teams.

Orlando Guardians signed a sponsorship agreement with "Miracle Toyota" dealership.

Media

Broadcasting
In May 2022, the XFL announced it had signed an exclusive agreement with ESPN Inc. and The Walt Disney Company to carry every XFL game across ESPN's platforms, ABC, and FX. The deal runs through 2027. The league's schedule was released January 5, 2023. FX will carry the majority of games through the first seven weeks of the season, including a marquee Saturday evening matchup most weeks during that time frame, with ESPN, ESPN2 and ABC assuming the full schedule from Week 8 onward. In all, FX will carry 11 games (down from the original 14 games), ESPN will carry 13 (up from 11 previously), ESPN2 will carry 10 (down from 11 previously), ABC will carry 8 (up from 7 previously), and FX and ESPN will simulcast one Week 1 regular season game. The ESPN+ streaming service will stream all of the league's games, while ESPN3 will simulcast ABC games, ESPN's TV Everywhere service will carry games simulcast on ESPN and ESPN2, with FX NOW app simulcasting FX games. In January 2023, ESPN announced its commentator teams for the 2023 season. ESPN Deportes will broadcast 16-game schedule that will offer Spanish-language coverage of games aired and will be led by play-by-play commentator Rebeca Landa and analyst Sergio Dipp.

ESPN will also host an XFL studio show called XFL Today during the season, with Jason Fitz, Skubie Mageza and Andrew Hawkins.

The league announced via Twitter that radio broadcasts of XFL games would be carried on Sirius XM on ESPN Xtra radio. There will be no terrestrial radio broadcasts in teams' home markets, with the league stating that it had approached radio stations in each city but had found that none were able to accommodate their hometown teams due to existing commitments to other local teams.

International broadcasters
In Canada, the 2023 season will be broadcast in English solely online through TSN+, a new subscription over-the-top service being launched by TSN. Games carried on ABC will still be available on traditional television in portions of the country via antenna, cable and satellite systems.

In Germany, Austria, and Switzerland, the 2023 and 2024 seasons will be broadcast by Sport1 and its pay-TV channel Sport1+.

"Player 54"
On February the league and ESPN announced a collaboration on a new original nine-part docuseries directed by Peter Berg, called "Player 54: Chasing the XFL Dream", which "chronicles the building of the XFL and follows the unique stories of players and coaches throughout the inaugural season". The first episode, an encore of the episode airing at ABC (it originally aired on ESPN2) , averaged 696,000 viewers.

Reception
The XFL's second return to play began with a game between the Vegas Vipers and Arlington Renegades on Saturday, February 18, 2023. The first week of games received tentative praise, with Bill Shea of The Athletic grading the return a B- in an article titled "I watched the XFL 3.0 so you don’t have to (but you should!): The key takeaways." However, TV ratings declined in comparison to the XFL's 2020 debut, as some blamed it on the league's promotional tactics. 1.54 million people watched the first game in 2023, down from the 3.3 million who watched the first game aired on ABC in 2020. Week 2's ratings again lagged as the games were the first to not air on broadcast television (as in 2020 at least two games aired on broadcast television each week). 

After the Vegas Vipers' home opener many fans began to question the decision to play in Las Vegas, as a result of a local rainstorm causing the field condition in Cashman Field to be "unplayable" while the announced attendance of 6,023 people dwindled as the game progressed, with some calling it a "disaster of optics" after the field's dead grass had to be spray-painted green and others even went as far as calling it a "literal dump". XFL President Russ Brandon addressed the issue a day later, stating: "We have no concerns over the Vegas Vipers' field. They'll continue to work on it, the cosmetic side of it, but the field is sound."

On March 12, the St. Louis BattleHawks eclipsed their own previously-set attendance record from 2020 with 38,310 spectators at their first home game of the season, a game against the Arlington Renegades.

See also
2023 USFL season

References

2023 XFL season
XFL (2020)